The Big Spring Church, located at 121 Rose Hill St. in Versailles in Woodford County, Kentucky, USA, was built in 1819. It was listed on the National Register of Historic Places in 1975.

It was built as a Baptist meeting house, at the head of a ravine holding the spring after which it is named.

References

Churches on the National Register of Historic Places in Kentucky
Georgian architecture in Kentucky
Churches completed in 1819
National Register of Historic Places in Woodford County, Kentucky
Baptist churches in Kentucky
1819 establishments in Kentucky
Versailles, Kentucky